Taratekan (also Romanized as Tarātekān) is a village in Piveshk Rural District, Lirdaf District, Jask County, Hormozgan Province, Iran. At the 2006 census, its population was 180, in 39 families.

References 

Populated places in Jask County